RAF Brampton Wyton Henlow is a former Royal Air Force unit covering three distinct sites in Cambridgeshire and Bedfordshire. The three sites, separately known as RAF Brampton, RAF Wyton and RAF Henlow, housed a number of flying training, intelligence, security and other RAF support organisations. On 2 April 2012 the unit was disbanded with RAF Brampton being renamed Brampton Camp RAF Wyton.

History
In 2001, the three RAF stations were brought together under the one umbrella with one station commander. RAF Stanbridge was brought into the agreement too, but was not formally noted in the tri-base name. At that time, RAF Brampton Wyton Henlow represented the largest RAF base in terms of real estate and personnel.

Based units

RAF Brampton (now closed)
Joint Air Reconnaissance Intelligence Centre (Formally closed down mid-2012)
Defence Security Standards Organisation 
No 73 (Huntingdon) Squadron Air Training Corps

RAF Wyton
57(R) Squadron 
Cambridge University Air Squadron 
London University Air Squadron
5 Air Experience Flight
Defence Equipment and Support 
No 2331 (St Ives) Squadron Air Training Corps

RAF Henlow
RAF Centre for Aviation Medicine
Joint Arms Control Implementation Group
Tactical Provost Wing (TPW)
No 1 Specialist Police Wing
No 8 RAF Force Protection Wing HQ
No 2482 (Henlow) Squadron Air Training Corps
No 616 Volunteer Gliding Squadron

References

External links
Official RAF site

Royal Air Force stations in Bedfordshire
Royal Air Force stations in Huntingdonshire
Royal Air Force stations in Cambridgeshire